Lyubomir Eftimov Ganev ( in Rousse), a.k.a. Lyubo Ganev or Lubo, is a Bulgarian former volleyball player. He was born in Rousse, where he started his career. He played with CSKA for seven years and was five times a champion with the team. From 1991 to 1997, Ganev played for Italian teams, before finishing his career at Greek side Aris in 1998. He participated in Bulgaria's national team from 1985 until 1998. He is 210 cm tall. He competed at the 1988 Summer Olympics and 1996 Summer Olympics. He issued a book in 2018.

References

External links
 Maritsa Dnes newspaper, 1999 (in Bulgarian)

1965 births
Living people
Sportspeople from Ruse, Bulgaria
Bulgarian men's volleyball players
Bulgarian expatriates in Italy
Aris V.C. players
Volleyball players at the 1988 Summer Olympics
Volleyball players at the 1996 Summer Olympics
Olympic volleyball players of Bulgaria